Fort Fisher Air Force Station was a United States Air Force installation located on the Atlantic coast  southwest of Kure Beach, North Carolina. Its primary mission was as a radar complex. It was closed on 30 June 1988 by the Air Force, and turned over to the Federal Aviation Administration (FAA).

Today the radar installation that was the main part of the site is part of the Joint Surveillance System (JSS), designated by NORAD as Eastern Air Defense Sector (EADS) Ground Equipment Facility J-02.

History
Fort Fisher during the American Civil War was a Confederate States of America stronghold that fell to Union forces on January 15, 1865 during the Second Battle of Fort Fisher.  "Fort Fisher" had earthworks for the fort's land face, known as Shepard's Battery.   In World War II, the nearby December 1940 Camp Davis had 5 live anti-aircraft ranges, including one named for Fort Fisher and which became the main AA range for the camp.

Fort Fisher AAF

Fort Fisher Army Airfield (Fort Fisher AAF) was established at the Fort Fisher anti-aircraft range and included construction of 48 frame buildings, 316 tent frames, showers and latrines, mess halls, warehouses, radio and meteorological stations, a post exchange, photo lab, recreation hall, outdoor theater, guardhouse, infirmary, and an administration building.  The site had a 10,000-gallon water storage tank, a motor pool, a large parade ground, three steel observation towers along the beach, and a  unpaved runway (the Shepard's Battery earthworks were leveled for the runway.)  Today,  the parking lot and visitor center for Fort Fisher sit on the remains of the runway.

When Camp Davis closed in 1944, Fort Fisher AAF had an 80-seat cafeteria, a 350-bed hospital and dental clinic, and covered an area of several hundred acres.

Fort Fisher AFS
Fort Fisher Air Force Station was opened in 1955 on part of the Fort Fisher AAF installation  as USAF Permanent System radar station "M-115" during a $1 billion increase for US continental defense after Hq USAF approved the Mobile Radar program in mid-1954. It was assigned to Air Defense Command (ADC) as part of a planned deployment of forty-four Mobile radar stations.  Fort Fisher AFS was designed as site M-115 and the 701st Aircraft Control and Warning Squadron was assigned on 1 August 1955.

ADC initially installed AN/MPS-7 and AN/MPS-8 radars at the site, and initially the station functioned as a Ground control intercept (GCI) and warning station to guide interceptor aircraft toward unidentified intruders picked up on the squadron's radar scopes.   By 1958 the AN/MPS-8 had been converted into an AN/GPS-3 and an AN/MPS-14 had been added.

In 1962 an AN/FPS-7C and AN/FPS-26 were placed in operation along with the AN/MPS-14 radars. During 1962 Fort Fisher AFS joined the Semi Automatic Ground Environment (SAGE) system, initially feeding data to DC-04 at Fort Lee AFS, Virginia.  After joining, the squadron was redesignated as the 701st Radar Squadron (SAGE) on 1 July 1962.  The radar squadron provided information 24/7 the SAGE Direction Center where it was analyzed to determine range, direction altitude speed and whether or not aircraft were friendly or hostile.

On 31 July 1963, the site was redesignated as NORAD ID Z-115. The station was supported logistically by nearby Myrtle Beach Air Force Base South Carolina.

SLBM surveillance
The Fort Fisher AFS AN/FPS-26 radar was converted to an Avco AN/FSS-7 SLBM Detection Radar that was operated by Detachment 5, 14th Missile Warning Squadron, Fourteenth Aerospace Force as part of the Avco 474N SLBM Detection and Warning System that "became operational in Mid-1972".
In addition to the main facility, Fort Fisher AFS operated several unmanned Gap Filler sites:
 Myrtle Beach, SC   (M-115A/Z-115A): 
 Fort Bragg, NC     (M-115B/Z-115B): 

Myrtle Beach operated an AN/FPS-14, while Fort Bragg operated an AN/FPS-18.  In addition, with the closure of ADC facilities at MCAS Cherry Point (M-116), the AN/FPS-14 Gap Filler at Holly Ridge, NC  was redesignated Z-115C in 1963.

The first BUIC III site (with AN/GYK-19) in Air Defense Command was at Fort Fisher AFS.

The 701st Radar Squadron (SAGE) was inactivated and replaced by the 701st Air Defense Group in March 1970  Just before inactivation, the squadron earned an Air Force Outstanding Unit Award for exceptionally meritorious service for the period from 1 December 1968 through 28 February 1970.  The upgrade to group status was done because of Fort Fisher AFS' status as a Backup Interceptor Control (BUIC) site.  BUIC sites were alternate control sites in the event that SAGE Direction Centers became disabled and unable to control interceptor aircraft. The group was inactivated and replaced by 701st Radar Squadron (SAGE) in January 1974. in reductions to defenses against manned bombers.  The group and squadron shared a second AF Outstanding Unit Award for the period 1 January 1973 through 31 December 1974.

Fort Fisher AFS came under Tactical Air Command jurisdiction in 1979 with the inactivation of Aerospace Defense Command and the creation of ADTAC.

The "Fuzzy-7" was deactivated after the Raytheon AN/FPS-115 PAVE PAWS Radar at Robins Air Force Base was completed on 5 June 1986,  and the base closed on 30 June 1988,  and the USAF retained the housing complex and converted it into the Fort Fisher Air Force Recreation Area which transferred to Seymour Johnson Air Force Base when Myrtle Beach AFB closed in 1993.

FAA facility
Ground Equipment Facility J-02 continued use of the USAF radar in the Joint Surveillance System (JSS), and "in 1995 an AN/FPS-91A performed search duties."  A portion of the base was returned to the state of North Carolina which turned much of it into the Fort Fisher State Recreation Area and historic site.

The Fort Fisher site is used by the National Guard as a training area and also hosts the Annual Seafood, Blues and Jazz Festival.

Air Force units and assignments

Units
Squadron
 Constituted as 701st Aircraft Control and Warning Squadron
 Activated 1 December 1953 at Dobbins Air Force Base (M-87), GA (not manned or equipped)
 Moved to Fort Fisher AFS on 1 August 1955
 Redesignated 701st Radar Squadron (SAGE), 1 July 1962
 Inactivated on 1 March 1970
 Redesignated 701st Radar Squadron on 1 January 1974
 Activated on 17 January 1974
 Inactivated on 30 June 1988

Group
 Constituted as 701st Air Defense Group on 13 February 1970
 Activated on 1 Mar 1970
 Inactivated on 17 Jan 1974
 Disbanded on 27 September 1984

Assignments
 35th Air Division, 1 December 1953
 85th Air Division, 1 March 1956
 35th Air Division, 1 September 1958
 Washington Air Defense Sector, 1 July 1961
 33d Air Division, 1 April 1966
 20th Air Division, 19 November 1969
 23d Air Division, 1 March 1983
 Southeast Air Defense Sector, 1 July 1987 – 30 June 1988

Awards

See also
 List of USAF Aerospace Defense Command General Surveillance Radar Stations
 List of United States Air Force aircraft control and warning squadrons

References

Notes
Explanatory notes

Footnotes

Bibliography

 
 
 
 
 
 
 
 AF Pamphlet 900-2, Unit Decorations, Awards and Campaign Participation Credits Department of the Air Force, Washington, DC, 15 Jun 1971
 AF Pamphlet 900-2, Unit Decorations, Awards and Campaign Participation Credits, Vol II Department of the Air Force, Washington, DC, 30 Sep 1976

External links
  

Installations of the United States Air Force in North Carolina
Buildings and structures in New Hanover County, North Carolina
Military installations closed in 1988
Semi-Automatic Ground Environment sites
1955 establishments in North Carolina
1988 disestablishments in North Carolina